The Jumbuck Pastoral Company is an Australian company that operates numerous cattle stations and sheep stations in Western Australia, South Australia and the Northern Territory

It is one of the largest landowners in Australia and the biggest wool grower.

The company is a privately held company owned by the MacLachlan family and is based in Adelaide. It was established in 1888 by H. P. MacLachlan who was known for his ability with stock and being able to ride out a drought. Initially the company was interested in wool growing in the arid at Paratoo Station near Yunta. Eventually it diversified into cattle.

By the mid-1920s MacLachlan's son, B. H. MacLachlan, was running the company after his father had loaned him £16,000 to acquire and develop lands in the Tarcoola area. When MacLachlan Senior died in 1939, B. H. continued to expand the development plan with Commonwealth Hill Station and Mulgathing Station shearing over 100,000 sheep in 1945.

B.H. MacLachlan handed over to his son, H.G. (Hugh) MacLachlan in 1960. Hugh took up pastoral leases in Western Australia at Rawlinna Station and Madura Plains.

The company was fined 100,000 in 2005 following the death of a jackaroo in New South Wales in 2001.

Hugh MacLachlan stepped down as the managing director of the company in 2009 after nearly half a century in the role. Both his sons, Jock and Callum, were appointed as joint managing directors.

In 2014 the company acquired Killarney Station in the Northern Territory for about 35 million.

References

Agriculture companies of Australia
Australian companies established in 1888
Food and drink companies established in 1888
Companies based in Adelaide